Zinc finger protein 791 is a protein that in humans is encoded by the ZNF791 gene.

References

Further reading 

Human proteins